Sir Simon James Bryan (born 23 November 1965) is a British High Court judge.

Education and early life 
He was educated at Arnold School. He attended Magdalene College, Cambridge, graduated with a double first-class BA degree on the law Tripos in 1987 and earned several academic prizes.

Career 
He was called to the Bar at Lincoln's Inn in 1988 with a Denning's Scholarship. He was a supervisor in law at Magdalene College from 1988 to 1989. He practised commercial law from Essex Court Chambers, where he also completed his pupillage, specialising in shipping, oil and gas litigation, insurance and reinsurance disputes and civil fraud. In addition to practice, he has been editor of the Encyclopedia of International Commercial Litigation since 2008. In 2008, he became a Queen's Counsel  (took Silk) and from 2009 to 2017 he served as a Recorder of the Crown Court. He was a Deputy High Court Judge from 2013 to 2017 and served as Chief Justice of the Falkland Islands, South Georgia and the South Sandwich Islands, the British Antarctic Territory and the British Indian Ocean Territory from 2015 to 2017.

In 2002, he was made a Freeman of the City of London and is a liveryman of the Worshipful Company of Gardeners. He was a member of the Court at the University of Hertfordshire from 2011 to 2015 and since 2020 has been on the Disciplinary Appeal Committee of Magdalene College, Cambridge.

High Court appointment 
On 2 October 2017, he was appointed as a judge of the High Court and assigned to the Queen's Bench Division. In the same year, he took the customary Knighthood. He sits in the Commercial Court and is authorised to hear cases on the Financial List, the Competition Appeal Tribunal, the Administrative Court and other King's Bench work including criminal cases. He has been Lead Presiding Judge on the South Eastern Circuit since 1 January 2023.

Personal life 
In 1989, he married Katharine Hilton, with whom he has one son and one daughter.

Arms

References 

Living people
1965 births
21st-century English judges
Knights Bachelor
Alumni of Magdalene College, Cambridge
Members of Lincoln's Inn
Queen's Bench Division judges
Falkland Islands judges
People educated at Arnold School